A Royal Decree of Alexander the Great, as an arbitration on a land dispute between the city of Philippi and local Thracians (presumably of the Edonian tribes), was discovered in a Byzantine basilica at Filippoi (1936) and published in 1984. The inscription, in two columns, bears the names of Leonnatus and Philotas, (possibly the companions), who act as arbitrators who would redraw the boundaries.  The units of measurement mentioned, are plethra and stadia.

See also 
 Macedonia (ancient kingdom)#Institutions

References 

 Greek text - SEG 34:664- Meletemata 22, Epig. App. 6
 Interstate arbitrations in the Greek world, 337-90 B.C. By Sheila L. Ager page 47 
 Readings in Greek history: sources and interpretations By D. Brendan Nagle, Stanley Mayer Burstein Page 243  
 The Genius of Alexander the Great By N. G. L. Hammond Page 32 

Interstate relations in ancient Greece
Government of Macedonia (ancient kingdom)
Greek inscriptions
Ancient Philippi
Thracian tribes of Macedonia
Thracian tribes
Alexander the Great
Arbitration cases
4th-century BC artefacts
Philippi